Taravat Khaksar (born 12 October 1993) is an Iranian karateka. She won the silver medal in the women's kumite 55 kg event at the 2018 Asian Games held in Jakarta, Indonesia. In the final, she lost against Wen Tzu-yun of Chinese Taipei. She won the gold medal in her event at the 2019 Asian Karate Championships held in Tashkent, Uzbekistan.

Career 

At the 2017 Islamic Solidarity Games held in Baku, Azerbaijan, she won one of the bronze medals in the women's kumite 55 kg event.

At the 2019 Asian Karate Championships held in Tashkent, Uzbekistan, she won the gold medal in the women's kumite 55 kg event. She also won the gold medal in the team kumite event.

She won one of the bronze medals in her event at the 2021 Asian Karate Championships held in Almaty, Kazakhstan.

Achievements

References

External links 
 
 

Living people
1993 births
Sportspeople from Tehran
Iranian female karateka
Karateka at the 2018 Asian Games
Medalists at the 2018 Asian Games
Asian Games medalists in karate
Asian Games silver medalists for Iran
Islamic Solidarity Games medalists in karate
Islamic Solidarity Games competitors for Iran
21st-century Iranian women